Dhoop Chhaon or Bhagya Chakra (also Known as 'Sun and Shade' or 'Wheel of Fate') is a 1935 Hindi movie directed by Nitin Bose. It was a remake of the Bengali film Bhagya Chakra. Dhoop Chhaon was the first Hindi film to use playback singing. It was Bose who came up with the idea of playback singing. He discussed with music director Raichand Boral and Bose's brother Mukul Bose, who was the sound recordist in New Theatres, implemented the idea.

Cast
 Kapoor as Hiralal
 Biswanath Bhadhuri as Shamlal
 K.C.Dey as Surdas
 Nawab as Manager
 Kedar as Asst. Manager
 Ajmat as Kallo-Ki-Ma
 Pahari Sanyal as Dipak
 Uma Devi as Mira
 Babulal as Mr. Tewari
 Debbala as Mira's mother
 Indu Mukherjee as Detective
 Shyam Law as Detective
 Pramathesh Barua as guest at party (uncredited)
 K. L. Saigal as guest#2 (uncredited)
 Vikram Nahar as guest#3 (uncredited)
 Vaid as Client
 Nagendrabala as Nurse
 Wahab as Stage-Dipak
 Sardar Aktar as Stage Kallo-Ki-Ma
 Triloke Kapur as Satyavan
 Ahi Sanyal as Bad Singer

Notes

External links

1935 films
1930s Hindi-language films
Films directed by Nitin Bose
Hindi remakes of Bengali films
Indian black-and-white films